Lasiopetalum behrii, commonly known as the pink velvet bush, is a species of flowering plant in the family Malvaceae and is endemic to southern continental Australia. It is an erect shrub with lance-shaped, narrowly oblong to narrowly elliptic leaves and groups of white to pink and reddish-brown flowers.

Description
The upper surface of the leaves is glabrous and the lower surface is densely covered with woolly, rust-coloured hairs.

Taxonomy
Lasiopetalum behrii was first formally described in 1855 by Ferdinand von Mueller in his Definitions of rare or hitherto undescribed Australian plants published in the Transactions of the Philosophical Society of Victoria, from specimens collected "In the Mallee Scrub on the Murray River and St. Vincent's Gulf" by Hans Hermann Behr. The specific epithet (behrii) honours the collector of the type specimens.

Distribution and habitat
Pink velvet bush grows in mallee, on sand dunes and on granite or limestone hills and occurs in the south of Western Australia, southern South Australia, the north-west of Victoria and the far south-west of New South Wales.

Conservation status
The species is listed as "critically endangered" in New South Wales under the Biodiversity Conservation Act 2016. The main threats to the species in New South Wales include its small population size and distribution, and grazing by livestock and feral goats.

References

behrii
Malvales of Australia
Flora of New South Wales
Flora of South Australia
Flora of Victoria (Australia)
Rosids of Western Australia
Taxa named by Ferdinand von Mueller
Plants described in 1855